Comandante Espora Airport , also known as Bahía Blanca Airport, is a domestic airport in Bahía Blanca, Argentina, which is served by Aerolíneas Argentinas and LADE.

Espora is also the main base of the Argentine Naval Aviation, and was given the identifier BACE by the Argentine Navy.

History 

Comandante Espora Air Naval Base was built in the 1930s to replace the old Puerto Belgrano Air Naval Base, which could not support the newer aircraft that the Argentine Naval Aviation was adding. The new base was built in grounds close to the existing Bahía Blanca Airfield (Spanish: Aeródromo Civil de Bahía Blanca, also known as Villa Harding Green), located approximately 5 kilometers from Bahía Blanca and 25 kilometers from Puerto Belgrano Naval Base. The new airfield was opened on 16 June 1939.

Between 1945 and 1964 it was the location of the Naval Aviation School, and in 1970 the Naval Aviation Command headquarters were located at Comandante Espora.

From 1968 the airport was opened to civil and commercial traffic replacing the old civil airstrip at Villa Harding Green. The installations and runway were expanded and in 1972 were released to the commercial traffic linking the Argentine South. In September 1977, the runways were extended to allow aircraft of Boeing 767 size.

Airlines and destinations

References

External links

  Aeropuerto de Bahia Blanca "Comandante Espora" at Organismo Regulador del Sistema Nacional de Aeropuertos
 
 
 BASES AERONAVALES DE LA ARMADA ARGENTINA - BASE AERONAVAL "COMANDANTE ESPORA" (BACE) (HistArMar website)  Accessed 09-Aug-2015

Airports in Buenos Aires Province
Argentine Naval Air Bases
Buenos Aires Province
Military installations of Argentina